Crustoderma is a genus of crust fungi in the family Meruliaceae.

Species
Crustoderma borbonicum Boidin & Gilles (1991)
Crustoderma carolinense Nakasone (1984)
Crustoderma corneum (Bourdot & Galzin) Nakasone (1984)
Crustoderma dryinum (Berk. & M.A.Curtis) Parmasto (1968)
Crustoderma efibulatum Kotir. & Saaren. (2006)
Crustoderma fibuligerum (K.S.Thind & S.S.Rattan) Duhem (2010)
Crustoderma flavescens Nakasone & Gilb. (1982)
Crustoderma fuscatum Gilb. & Nakasone (2003)
Crustoderma gigacystidium Gilb. & Hemmes (2001)
Crustoderma longicystidiatum (Litsch.) Nakasone (1984)
Crustoderma marianum Nakasone (1984)
Crustoderma nakasoneae Gilb. & M.Blackw. (1988)
Crustoderma opuntiae Nakasone & Gilb. (1982)
Crustoderma patricium (G.Cunn.) Nakasone (1984)
Crustoderma resinosum (H.S.Jacks. & Dearden) Gilb. (1981)
Crustoderma testatum (H.S.Jacks. & Dearden) Nakasone (1985)
Crustoderma triste (Litsch. & S.Lundell) Duhem (2010)
Crustoderma vulcanense (Gilb. & Adask.) Gilb. & Nakasone (2003)

Taxa described in 1968
Meruliaceae
Polyporales genera